Ali Safa-Sonboli (November 20, 1932 – 2002) was an Iranian weightlifter. He won silver medals at the 1958 Asian Games and 1957 World Championships, placing third in 1958. At the 1960 Summer Olympics he failed to complete the snatch event. After retiring from competitions he worked as an international weightlifting referee. He died in 2002 and is survived by two sons.

References

Iranian male weightlifters
Iranian strength athletes
1932 births
World Weightlifting Championships medalists
2002 deaths
Weightlifters at the 1960 Summer Olympics
Olympic weightlifters of Iran
Asian Games silver medalists for Iran
Asian Games medalists in weightlifting
Weightlifters at the 1958 Asian Games
Medalists at the 1958 Asian Games
People from Qaem Shahr
Sportspeople from Mazandaran province
20th-century Iranian people